The 1908 SAFL Grand Final was an Australian rules football competition.  beat  52 to 49.

References 

SANFL Grand Finals
SAFL Grand Final, 1908